Unione Sportiva Dilettantistica Castelsardo is an Italian association football club located in Castelsardo, Sardinia. It currently plays in Serie D. Its colors are red and blue.

Famous players
Antonio Langella

External links
Official homepage
Castelsardo page at Serie-D.com

Football clubs in Italy
Football clubs in Sardinia
Association football clubs established in 1958
1958 establishments in Italy